Brenandendron donianum is a plant in the family Asteraceae, native to West and West-Central Africa.

Description
Its branches and inflorescences are pubescent. The inflorescences feature white or purple flowers.

Distribution and habitat
Brenandendron donianum is native to an area from Guinea to the Democratic Republic of the Congo. Its habitat is in forests.

References

Vernonieae
Flora of West Tropical Africa
Flora of West-Central Tropical Africa
Plants described in 1836